Ajit Pramod Kumar Jogi (29 April 1946  29 May 2020) was an Indian politician, who served as the first chief minister of Chhattisgarh, India. He was a member of the political party named Janta Congress Chhattisgarh.

Education 
Jogi studied Mechanical Engineering at Maulana Azad College of Technology (MACT), Bhopal. He was college topper and hence won the University Gold Medal in 1968. He studied law at the Faculty of Law, University of Delhi. After having worked briefly as a lecturer at the National Institute of Technology, Raipur, he was selected for two of the most coveted civil services of India; the Indian Police Service and the Indian Administrative Service. He was selected for the Indian Police Service at age of 22. Two years later he was selected for Indian Administrative Service (IAS). He was posted in his home state, Madhya Pradesh as an IAS officer.

Personal life 

He was born on April 29, 1946, at Gaurela in Marwahi district of Chhattisgarh. He is survived by wife Renu Jogi who is MLA from Kota constituency and son Amit Jogi who is a former MLA. He was a gold medalist in Mechanical Engineering. He began his professional career as a lecturer in one of the engineering colleges of Raipur city. After completion of his IAS training he was deputed at Raipur as District Magistrate. He was chosen by then Chief Minister Prakash Chandra Sethi to be collector for Sidhi district. He later served as the collector of Shahdol, Raipur and Indore districts. He was considered a bright officer in his role as an IAS officer. He grasped the issues quickly which enabled him to guide his political seniors correctly, as he had a good knowledge on rules and regulations. He was known for having good memory. He could quote the sections from acts at appropriate moments. Even his juniors in court work used to emulate his work. In year 2000 his daughter Anusha committed suicide. In year 2004, he met with a car crash while campaigning for the Lok Sabha elections in Mahasamund, which left him paralysed from waist downwards. However he kept himself physically active for close to 16 years and remained active in politics. During his last days he was working on his autobiography.

Political career 

In the course of his professional work in Sidhi district, he was introduced to Mr.Arjun Singh, a prominent politician from Madhya Pradesh, who later became his mentor in politics. When Arjun Singh became Chief Minister in 1980, he appointed Ajit Jogi as the collector for Raipur and later that of Indore. Ajit Jogi was introduced couple of times by Arjun Singh to Rajiv Gandhi, who was President of Congress Party, who took special interest in him and a guiding factor for him to quit professional service to enter politics. He quit the civil services in 1986 and joined Indian National Congress party. Later he became member of Rajya Sabha at age of 40. He was nominated for the second time too for Rajya Sabha in year 1992, during Prime Ministership of Late Mr.P V. Narasimha Rao. However, he rose to prominence after creation of state Chhattisgarh from the state of Madhya Pradesh in November 2000, when he was chosen to be its first Chief Minister. However BJP won the state's maiden elections held in December 2003, and Ajit Jogi's Congress government was unseated. Though BJP retained power by winning elections in year 2008 and 2013, Ajit Jogi retained his prominence in State Congress party. In 1998, he contested the Lok Sabha elections from Raigarh, a constituency reserve for members of Scheduled Tribe and won. However, he lost the Lok Sabha elections in year 1999 from Shahdol. In year 2000, Chhattisgarh was carved out of Madhya Pradesh, and Sonia Gandhi as President of Congress, chose him as Chief Minister of the newly carved state. Though he did not have political experience which was considered a limitation, his immense experience as Government servant and intelligence made him comfortable in the role and adjust easily. As Chief Minister he had complete grip on state affairs. Ajit Jogi was a unique person who combined politics in administration and administration in politics in his role of governing the state. As the decision making was centralised with him, ministers had little work. His bureaucrats used to take important decisions regarding affairs of the state. However the elections in November 2003 proved disappointing for him. He had an immense popularity in Satnami Community, a powerful Scheduled Caste group in Chhattisgarh. In 2016, he floated the Janata Congress Chhattisgarh (JCC), after appealing to the Congress high command. In 2018, his party tied up with the Bahujan Samaj Party (BSP), for the Assembly elections. He is known to have a new form of politics, one that invoked Chhattisgarh pride and sub-nationalism. Even after near-fatal accident in a car crash in 2004 while campaigning for Lok sabha elections from Mahasamund which made him paralysed from waist downwards, Jogi contested assembly election and won against his ex-party colleague Vidya Charan Shukla from BJP.

2014 Lok Sabha election campaign 
During the run-up to the 2014 Lok Sabha elections for the Mahasamund seat, eleven independent candidates filed their nominations in the name of Chandu Lal Sahu. Ajit Jogi was representing Indian National Congress, his main contender was Chandu Lal Sahu from the BJP. Sahu ultimately won the election for the Mahasamund seat but only by small margin of 133 votes and Jogi was accused of creating 11 namesakes similar to his BJP rival, as independents, to confuse voters.

Positions held 
 Jogi served as a District collector of Indore during 1981–85
 1986–87 Member, All India Congress Committee (AICC) on welfare of scheduled castes and scheduled tribes.
 1986–1998 Member, Rajya Sabha (two terms)
 1987–1989 General secretary, Pradesh-Congress Committee, Madhya Pradesh and also, member of committees on Public Undertakings, Industries, and Railways.
 1989 Central Observer of the Indian National Congress for elections to Lok Sabha from constituencies in Manipur.
 1995 Central Observer of the Indian National Congress for elections to Sikkim Assembly.
 1995-96 Chairman of Committees on Science and Technology and Environment and Forests
 1996 Member, Core group, AICC Parliamentary elections (Lok Sabha)
 1996 Indian Delegation to the United Nations for the 50th Anniversary Celebrations, New York.
 1997 Observer, Delhi Pradesh Congress Committee Elections. Member, AICC. Member of committees on Transport and Tourism, Rural and Urban Development, Consultative Committee, Ministry of Coal, Consultative Committee, Ministry of Energy, Public Accounts Committee, Convenor, Sub-Committee on Indirect Taxes, Panel of vice-chairmen, Rajya Sabha
 1997 Indian Delegation to 98th IPU Conference, Cairo
 1998 Elected as a Member of Parliament (MP) to the 12th Lok Sabha for the Raigarh constituency in Chhattisgarh
 1998–2000 Spokesman, AICC, Whip, Congress Parliamentary Party, Working President, Madhya Pradesh Congress Committee
 1998–99 Member, Committee on Human Resource Development and its Sub-Committee-II on Medical Education, Committee on Coal, Consultative Committee, Ministry of Coal
 2000–2003 Chief Minister of Chhattisgarh
 2004–2008 MP in the 14th Lok Sabha for Mahasamund, Chhattisgarh
 2008– Member of the Legislative Assembly of Chhattisgarh, representing the Marwahi constituency

Controversies
In June 2007, Jogi and his son were arrested in connection with the murder of Nationalist Congress Party (NCP) treasurer Ram Avtar Jaggi, who was shot dead in June 2003. However, after five years of the registering of a case against him, Central Bureau of Investigation (CBI) based on an opinion of then Additional Solicitor General of India (ASG) Gopal Subramanian said that Jogi could not be prosecuted under any law. However the Bharatiya Janata Party (BJP) alleged that the Congress led UPA government misused the Central Bureau of Investigation (CBI) to protect Jogi.

On 6 June 2016, Jogi announced he was breaking his affiliation with Indian National Congress at a political gathering in Chhattisgarh.

In August 2019, a high-level judicial committee dismissed Jogi's claim of belonging to a Scheduled Tribe (ST) and cancelled all his caste certificates. Jogi was booked under Indian Penal Code sections 420 (cheating), 467 (forgery of valuable security), 468 (forgery for purpose of cheating) and 471 (using as genuine a forged document or electronic record). Additionally, Jogi was accused of cheating and forgery in connection with the declaration in a poll affidavit submitted by him during the 2013 Assembly elections. Facing a first information report (FIR) and arrests in the fake caste certificate case, Jogi was admitted to a private hospital in Delhi-NCR after he complained of breathing problem.

Death
Jogi died in the afternoon of Friday, 29 May 2020, aged 74. His son, Amit Jogi, confirmed the news on his official Twitter page. Jogi was admitted to hospital after a heart attack, which was caused by a tamarind seed stuck in his throat. Since he was a Christian, he was laid to rest at a cemetery at Jyotipur area in Gaurela town of GPM district in Chhattisgarh.

Janta Congress Chhattisgarh (J) 
The Janta Congress Chhattisgarh political party was founded by Jogi, after he and his son Amit were expelled from the Indian National Congress due to anti-party activities as well as sabotaging Antagarh by-poll elections. Amit was expelled for six years.

Jogi launched a party in Thathapur village of Kawardha district and directly challenged Chief Minister of Chhattisgarh Raman Singh.

In February 2018, Jogi announced that he would contest the election from Rajnandgaon, and after some time he also announced that he would contest the election from Marwahi. On 29 April Jogi gathered more than 72000 people for rally on his birthday.

References 

|-

|-

India MPs 1998–1999
1946 births
2020 deaths
Chhattisgarh MLAs 2000–2003
Chhattisgarh MLAs 2008–2013
Chief ministers from Indian National Congress
Chief Ministers of Chhattisgarh
Indian Christians
Indian civil servants
Indian National Congress politicians
Janta Congress Chhattisgarh politicians
Lok Sabha members from Chhattisgarh
People from Bilaspur, Chhattisgarh
Rajya Sabha members from Madhya Pradesh
United Progressive Alliance candidates in the 2014 Indian general election